New Castle is a city in New Castle County, Delaware, United States. The city is located six miles (10 km) south of Wilmington and is situated on the Delaware River. As of the 2010 census, the city's population was 5,285.

History 
New Castle was originally settled by the Dutch West India Company in 1651 under the leadership of Peter Stuyvesant on the site of a former aboriginal village, "Tomakonck" ("Place of the Beaver"), to assert their claim to the area based on a prior agreement with the aboriginal inhabitants of the area.  The Dutch originally named the settlement Fort Casimir, but this was changed to Fort Trinity (Swedish: Trefaldighet) following its seizure by the colony of New Sweden on Trinity Sunday, 1654. The Dutch conquered the entire colony of New Sweden the following year and rechristened the fort Nieuw-Amstel ("New Amstel", after the Amstel). This marked the end of the Swedish colony in Delaware as an official entity, but it remained a semi-autonomous unit within the New Netherland colony and the cultural, social, and religious influence of the Swedish settlers remained strong. As the settlement grew, Dutch authorities laid out a grid of streets and established the town common (The "Green"), which continue to this day.

In 1664, the English seized the entire New Netherland colony in the Second Anglo-Dutch War. They changed the name of the town to "New Castle" and made it the capital of their Delaware Colony. The Dutch regained the town in 1673 during the Third Anglo-Dutch War but it was returned to Great Britain the next year under the Treaty of Westminster. In 1680, New Castle was conveyed to William Penn by the Duke of York by livery of seisin and was Penn's landing place when he first set foot on American soil on October 27, 1682. This transfer to Penn was contested by Lord Baltimore and the boundary dispute was not resolved until the survey conducted by Mason and Dixon, now famed in history as the Mason–Dixon line.

Prior to the establishment of Penn's Philadelphia, New Castle was a center of government. After being transferred to Penn, Delaware's Swedish, Dutch, and English residents used to the relaxed culture of the Restoration monarchy grew uncomfortable with the more conservative Quaker influence, so Delaware petitioned for a separate legislature, which was finally granted in 1702.  Delaware formally broke from Pennsylvania in 1704. New Castle again became the seat of the colonial government, thriving with the various judges and lawyers that fueled the economy.  Many smaller houses were torn down and replaced in this era.  In February, 1777, John McKinly was elected the first President of Delaware (a title later renamed "Governor"). During the Revolution, when New Castle was besieged by William Howe, the government elected to move its functions south to Dover in May, 1777.  McKinley was captured by the British and held prisoner for several months. New Castle remained the county seat until after the Civil War, when that status was transferred to Wilmington. Three signers of the Declaration of Independence were from New Castle—Thomas McKean, George Read, and George Ross.

The  portage between the Delaware River and Chesapeake Bay saved a  trip around the Delmarva Peninsula, so this brought passengers, goods, and business to New Castle's port.  In the years following the Revolution, a turnpike was built to facilitate travel between the two major waterways.  Later, New Castle became the eastern terminus of the New Castle and Frenchtown Railroad, the second-oldest rail line in the country, launched in 1828 with horse-drawn rail cars, then converting to steam power when an engine was purchased from Great Britain in 1832. The line traversed the Delmarva Peninsula, running to the Elk River, Maryland, from where passengers changed to packet boats for further travel to Baltimore and points south.  This helped the New Castle economy to further boom; however, by 1840, rail lines were in place between Philadelphia and Baltimore, which had a stop in Wilmington, thus leaving New Castle to deal with a substantial decline in traffic and revenue.

The decline in New Castle's economy had the long-range fortunate effect of preventing most residents from making any significant structural changes to their homes.  So, the many buildings of historic New Castle look much as they did in the colonial and Federal periods.

New Castle has a tradition, dating back to 1927, of tours of historical homes, churches, and gardens. These tours, called "A Day in Olde New Castle", are usually held on the third Saturday of May. Householders dress in colonial costumes and an admittance fee is collected which is used toward the maintenance of the town's many historic buildings.  In June the town holds its annual Separation Day celebration.

On April 28, 1961, an F3 tornado hit the north side. Although no fatalities or injuries occurred, it was the only tornado of this magnitude ever recorded in Delaware.

Geography 

According to the U.S. Census Bureau, the city has a total area of 3.2 square miles (8.2 km), of which 3.0 square miles (7.9 km) of it is land and 0.1 square miles (0.3 km) of it (3.79%) is water.

The city is the home of Broad Dyke, the first dyke built in the United States.

Demographics 

As of the census of 2000, there were 4,862 people, 2,012 households, and 1,339 families residing in the city. The racial makeup of the city was 77.48% White, 20.20% African American, 0.25% Native American, 0.39% Asian, 0.84% from other races, and 0.84% from two or more races. Hispanic or Latino of any race were 2.41% of the population.

There were 2,012 households, out of which 26.2% had children under the age of 18 living with them, 47.1% were married couples living together, 14.9% had a female householder with no husband present, and 33.4% were non-families. 27.7% of all households were made up of individuals, and 9.8% had someone living alone who was 65 years of age or older. The average household size was 2.42 and the average family size was 2.93.

In the city, the population was spread out, with 21.8% under the age of 18, 7.8% from 18 to 24, 28.6% from 25 to 44, 27.5% from 45 to 64, and 14.4% who were 65 years of age or older. The median age was 40 years. For every 100 females, there were 88.3 males. For every 100 females age 18 and over, there were 85.6 males.

The median income for a household in the city was $52,449, and the median income for a family was $56,368. Males had a median income of $40,153 versus $31,571 for females. The per capita income for the city was $24,052. About 3.9% of families and 5.3% of the population were below the poverty line, including 5.8% of those under age 18 and 7.5% of those age 65 or over.

Arts and culture

Historic sites 

The  New Castle Historic District is an area approximately 4 by 5 blocks square in the center of town with about 500 historic buildings that date from c. 1700 to 1940.  This area contains one of the highest concentrations of well-preserved buildings dating from the 17th to early 19th centuries.  It was declared a National Historic Landmark in 1967.

The historic district was listed on the National Register of Historic Places in 1967 and it was relisted, with enlarged boundaries and expanded period of significance, in 1984. The historic district then covered  of area and includes Amstel House and Old Courthouse which are separately listed on the NRHP.  The area includes 461 contributing buildings, one other contributing structure, and one contributing object.

The New Castle Court House, the Green, and the Sheriff's House are parts of First State National Historical Park, a unit of the National Park System.  The national park interprets Delaware's settlement and role in the founding of the United States.

Notable sites the historic district include:
 Amstel House, home of New Castle Historical Society
 Stonum, house of George Read
 Read House and Garden, former home of George Read Jr.  The house, built between 1801 and 1804.
 Immanuel Episcopal Church on the Green
 New Castle Court House Museum, original colonial capitol; first state house of Delaware. Served as Court House until 1882, when county seat was moved to Wilmington. Its cupola served as the center of the Twelve-Mile Circle which defined Delaware's boundary with Pennsylvania.
 Old "Dutch" House, (ca. 1700), a typical small early dwelling
 Thomas McKean House
 New Castle Presbyterian Church, (1707)
 Lesley-Travers Mansion, built in 1855.

The Bellanca Airfield, located outside of the Historic District, is the site of the former Bellanca Aircraft Corporation factory (1928–1960) which built over 3,000 airplanes.  Delaware Aviation Hall of Fame Museum is located in hangar.  Also nearby are Buena Vista, Glebe House, The Hermitage, New Castle Ice Piers, Penn Farm of the Trustees of the New Castle Common, and Swanwyck, all listed on the National Register of Historic Places.

International relations 
The town attended a World Summit of towns called Newcastle held in Newcastle-under-Lyme in England for six days from 17 June 2006

Neuburg an der Donau, Germany
Neuchâtel, Switzerland
Neufchâteau, Vosges, France 
New Castle, Indiana, United States
New Castle, Pennsylvania, United States
Newcastle-under-Lyme, England
Newcastle upon Tyne, England
Newcastle, KwaZulu-Natal, South Africa
Shinshiro, Japan

Education 
New Castle is served by the Colonial School District. It operates William Penn High School.

Private schools located in New Castle include: Serviam Girls Academy, St. Peter's Catholic School (of the Roman Catholic Diocese of Wilmington) and Delaware Valley Classical School.

New Castle Public Library is the public library.

Infrastructure

Transportation

U.S. Route 13 and U.S. Route 40 are the most significant highways serving New Castle directly. They pass along the northwest edge of the city concurrently along Dupont Highway. 
Delaware Route 9 runs southwest-to-northeast through New Castle, passing through the city along 7th Street, Washington Street, Delaware Street, and Ferry Cut Off Street; the route bypasses the historic area. DE 9 heads north to Wilmington and south to Delaware City. Delaware Route 141 heads north from New Castle on Basin Road and provides a bypass to the west of Wilmington. Delaware Route 273 heads west from New Castle on Frenchtown Road and provides access to Christiana and Newark. Several important roads are located just outside the city limits. Interstate 295 passes north of New Castle and crosses the Delaware River on the Delaware Memorial Bridge to New Jersey, with DE 9 providing access to New Castle from I-295.

The Wilmington Airport (formerly New Castle Airport) is located northwest of New Castle along US 13/US 40. The airport offers general aviation and formerly had commercial air service. The nearest airport to New Castle with commercial air service is the Philadelphia International Airport in Philadelphia.

A freight line operated by the Norfolk Southern Railway passes through New Castle. The nearest passenger rail station to New Castle is Wilmington station in Wilmington, which is served by Amtrak and SEPTA Regional Rail's Wilmington/Newark Line.

DART First State provides bus service to New Castle along Route 15 and Route 51, which both run between downtown Wilmington and the Christiana Mall and offer connections to multiple bus routes serving points across northern New Castle County.

Utilities
The Municipal Services Commission of the City of New Castle provides electricity and water to the city. The electric department is a member of the Delaware Municipal Electric Corporation. Natural gas service in New Castle is provided by Delmarva Power, a subsidiary of Exelon. The city's Public Works department provides trash and recycling collection to New Castle.

Notable people 
 Walter W. Bacon, 60th Governor of Delaware
 John Walter Bratton, songwriter
 William C. Frazer, American lawyer and judge
 Thomas Holcomb, Commandant of the United States Marine Corps
 Dave May, former MLB player
 Thomas McKean, lawyer, politician and a signer of the Declaration of Independence
 Vinnie Moore, guitarist
 George Read I, signer of the Declaration of Independence and the Constitution, second Governor of Delaware
 George Ross, signer of the Declaration of Independence
 Jeff Otah, NFL player
 Ryan Phillippe, actor
 Devin Smith, professional basketball player for Maccabi Tel Aviv
 Charles Thomas, 25th Governor of Delaware
 Nicholas Van Dyke I, President of Delaware
 Nicholas Van Dyke II, son of Nicholas Van Dyke I, U.S. Senator
  Jalen Duren, professional basketball player for the Detroit Pistons

In film 

New Castle has served as the filming location for numerous films and television series, including Dead Poets Society, Beloved, and River Ridge.

References

External links 

 Virtual tour of New Castle's historic sites
 City of New Castle
 Out of the Hurly-Burly A book about life in New castle about 1870

 
Federal architecture in Delaware
Former colonial and territorial capitals in the United States
Populated places established in 1651
Cities in New Castle County, Delaware
Cities in Delaware
Former county seats in Delaware
1651 establishments in the Dutch Empire
National Historic Landmarks in Delaware
National Register of Historic Places in New Castle County, Delaware
Historic districts in Delaware
Delaware populated places on the Delaware River